Sound-System is the thirty-sixth album by jazz pianist Herbie Hancock and the second of three albums co-produced by Bill Laswell with the ‘Rockit’ Band. Guest artists include saxophonist Wayne Shorter, guitarist Henry Kaiser, kora player/percussionist Foday Musa Suso and drummer Anton Fier.

Background
The second of the three Rockit band albums, Sound-System was another smash for Herbie Hancock. Winning his second Grammy award for Best R&B Performance (his second-straight award), this album tried to capture the success of the previous Future Shock, with some more twists and turns.

"Junku" for instance, featured Foday Musa Suso and also was written for the 1984 Summer Olympics in Los Angeles.  It served as the "Field" theme. It also was used during Hancock's appearance on the long-running NBC Saturday Night Live.

"Sound System" sounded like "Junku" in many ways, while "Karabali" featured Wayne Shorter (playing a lyricon, instead of a traditional saxophone) and went back to the days of Hancock's African themed Mwandishi band.

Reception

Robert Christgau commented "Future Shock was a pretty good album despite its dink quotient; this is a better album despite its schlock quotient. Where's-the-melody is beside the point, because even when they're just hooks the melodies seem a little obvious, without the physical or intellectual bite of the rhythm tracks (nowhere mightier than on the amazing "Metal Beat," recommended to those who think Trevor Horn is into something heavy). And me, I doubt Herbie should be playing more "jazz"—several of the false moments here are provided by Saint Wayne Shorter himself. The African exotica of Foday Musa Suso and Aiyb Dieng, on the other hand, sounds right at home. As does the South Bronx exotica of D.St." Richard S. Ginell of AllMusic noted "In the grand tradition of sequels, Sound-System picks up from where Future Shock left off – if anything, even louder and more bleakly industrial than before... Hancock's electric music still retained its adventurous edge.

Track listing
"Hardrock" (Herbie Hancock, Bill Laswell, Derek Showard) – 6:10
"Metal Beat" (Herbie Hancock, Bill Laswell) – 4:56
"Karabali" (Herbie Hancock, Daniel Poncé) – 5:17
"Junku" (Herbie Hancock, Bill Laswell, Foday Musa Suso, Aiyb Dieng) – 5:32
"People are Changing" (Timmy Thomas) – 6:05
"Sound System" (Herbie Hancock, Bill Laswell, Foday Musa Suso) – 5:55

Bonus track from CD reissue
 "Metal Beat (Extended Version)" (Herbie Hancock, Bill Laswell) – 6:44

Personnel

Musicians 
 Herbie Hancock – Yamaha DX7 (1, 2, 4, 5, 6), Fairlight CMI (1–4, 6), Rhodes Chroma (1, 4), E-mu 4060 digital keyboard (1), Apple IIe computer (1), acoustic piano (3, 4, 5), Memorymoog (4), clavinet (6)
 Will Alexander – Fairlight CMI programming (1, 2, 3, 6)
 Rob Stevens – synthesizers (1, 4), programming (4)
 D.S.T. – turntables (1, 2, 6), sound effects (1, 2, 6)
 Henry Kaiser – guitar (1, 2)
 Nicky Skopelitis – guitar (1, 6)
 Bill Laswell – electric bass (1, 4, 6), Oberheim DMX (1, 2, 4, 6), tapes (1, 4), shortwave electronics (2)
 Anton Fier – Simmons drums (1, 2, 6), percussion (1, 2, 6), cymbals (2), Synare (6), timpani (6)
 Daniel Poncé – assorted percussion (1, 3)
 Aïyb Dieng – assorted percussion (2, 4, 5, 6), Roland TR-808 (5)
 Foday Musa Suso – assorted percussion (2, 6), dusunguni (2, 4), balafon (2), kora (4, 6), kalimba (4), guitar (6)
 Hamid Drake – cymbals (3)
 Wayne Shorter – lyricon (2), soprano saxophone (3)
 Bernard Fowler – voice (2), vocals (3, 5), vocal arrangements (3, 5)
 Toshinori Kondo – speaking voice (2), trumpet (6)

Production 
 Herbie Hancock – producer 
 Bill Laswell – producer 
 Material – producers 
 Tony Meilandt – associate producer 
 Rob Stevens – engineer, recording 
 Lawrence A. Duhart – engineer
 Billy Youdelman – engineer
 Carolyn Collins – assistant engineer
 Sam Fishkin – assistant engineer
 Haun Rowe – assistant engineer
 Lothar Segeler – assistant engineer
 Dave Jerden – mixing 
 Howie Weinberg – mastering 
 David Em – cover image artwork 
 Norman Seeff – photography

Studios
 Recorded at Evergreen Studios (New York City, NY); Studio Media (Evanston, IL); El Dorado Studios and Garage Sale Recording (Los Angeles, CA).
 Mixed at El Dorado Studios (Los Angeles, CA).
 Mastered at Masterdisk (New York City, NY).

References

External links
 Sound-System at Discogs

1984 albums
Herbie Hancock albums
Albums produced by Bill Laswell
Columbia Records albums